Derek Alec Rawcliffe OBE (8 July 1921 – 1 February 2011) was an English Anglican bishop and author. He served as the Bishop of the New Hebrides and the Scottish Episcopal Church's Bishop of Glasgow and Galloway.

Life and ministry 
Rawcliffe was born in Manchester, the son of a tobacconist, on 8 July 1921. He was brought up in Gloucester and educated at Leeds University. He was ordained deacon in 1944 and priest in 1945. After a curacy at Claines St George, Worcester between 1944 and 1947, he became a teacher in the Solomon Islands until 1953 when he became Archdeacon of Southern Melanesia and the New Hebrides. He was Assistant Bishop of Melanesia between 1974 and 1975, and then became the first Bishop of the New Hebrides, serving from 1975 to 1980 when he was translated to Glasgow and Galloway, in the Scottish Episcopal Church on 20 January 1981. In Scotland. He retired on 28 February 1991.

After retirement he was made an honorary assistant bishop in the Diocese of Ripon, where he became the first bishop in the Church of England to announce that he was gay, after disclosing his sexuality on television in 1995. Rawcliffe later argued for the age of consent for homosexual relations to be reduced to 14,

Rawcliffe died on 1 February 2011 at the age of 89.

Archives
Rawcliff's papers are held by SOAS Archives.

References

External links
 Link to information on Rawcliffe's archived papers

1921 births
2011 deaths
Clergy from Manchester
Alumni of the University of Leeds
Archdeacons of Southern Melanesia
Bishops of Glasgow and Galloway
20th-century Scottish Episcopalian bishops
People educated at Sir Thomas Rich's School
English LGBT people
LGBT Anglican bishops
Officers of the Order of the British Empire
Anglican assistant bishops of Melanesia
Anglican bishops of New Hebrides, Vanuatu and New Caledonia
Diocese of Vanuatu and New Caledonia
20th-century Anglican bishops in Oceania
21st-century LGBT people